Julian Simon is an economist.

Julian Simon may also refer to:

Julián Simón, Spanish motorcycle racer
Julian Simon Fellowship
Julian Simon (tennis), see Andy Ram

See also
Jules Simon, French politician
Julian Simmons, TV presenter
Julien Simon, French professional cyclist

Simon, Julian